The Utsubo Tennis Center is a tennis complex situated in the Utsubo Park, Nishi-ku, Osaka, Japan. The complex was the host of the HP Open (WTA International tournaments) from 2009 through 2014. The stadium court has a capacity of 5,000 people, second court has a capacity of 500 people.

External links
 Utsubo Tennis Center, wikimapia
 List of tennis stadiums by capacity
 [Utsubo Tennis Center] (Official page in Japanese language)

Tennis venues in Japan
Sports venues in Osaka